This is a list of Florida Confederate Civil War units. The list of Florida Union Civil War units is shown separately.

Infantry
 1st Florida Infantry Regiment
 2nd Florida Infantry Regiment
 3rd Florida Infantry Regiment
 Jacksonville Light Infantry (Company A)
 Saint Augustine Blues'' (Company B)
 4th Florida Infantry Regiment
 5th Florida Infantry Regiment
 6th Florida Infantry Regiment
 7th Florida Infantry Regiment
 8th Florida Infantry Regiment
 9th Florida Infantry Regiment
 10th Florida Infantry Regiment
 11th Florida Infantry Regiment
 1st Florida (Reserves) Infantry
 1st Florida (Holland`s) Infantry Battalion (1st Special Btln.)
 2nd Florida Infantry Battalion

Cavalry
 1st Cavalry
 2nd Cavalry
 3rd Battalion, Cavalry
 5th (Scott's) Battalion, Cavalry
 1st (Munnerlyn's) Battalion, Special Cavalry (Cow Cavalry)
 Fernandez's Mounted Company
 Smith's Cavalry Company

Artillery
 Abell's Light Artillery Company
 Dyke's Light Artillery Company
 Kilcrease Light Artillery
 Marion Light Artillery (Perry's)
 Milton Light Artillery Company

Miscellaneous
 Florida Miscellaneous
 Harrison's (Captain) Company
 McBride's (Captain) Company 
 Pickett's (Captain) Company

See also
Lists of American Civil War Regiments by State
Confederate Units by State

External links
 1st Florida Infantry Battalion at the Battle of Olustee, Florida
 6th Florida Infantry Battalion at the Battle of Olustee, Florida
 Abell's Artillery at the Battle of Olustee, Florida
 Gamble's (Leon Light) Artillery at the Battle of Olustee, Florida
 2nd Florida Cavalry at the Battle of Olustee, Florida
 5th Florida Cavalry Battalion at the Battle of Olustee, Florida

 
Florida
Civil War
Florida in the American Civil War